Yoo Jae-suk (or  ; born on 14 August 1972) is a South Korean comedian, host and television personality. He has hosted several variety television shows in South Korea, including Infinite Challenge, Running Man, Happy Together, and Hangout With Yoo. Known for his quick wit and appeal across a wide range of demographics, Yoo has established himself as one of South Korea's top comedians and TV personalities, as well as one of the most well-known and popular celebrities in South Korea.

Early life and education 
Born on 14 August 1972 in Seoul, Yoo is the eldest of three siblings. In 1991, he completed his high school education and graduated from the Yongmoon High School in Seoul. In the same year, Yoo entered the acting department of Seoul Institute of the Arts.

Career

Beginnings
Yoo's television debut was on the KBS Comedian Festival (for college students) in 1991, where he performed a parody of a commercial with Choi Seung-gyung. His dancing to a cover of the song "Step by Step" by New Kids on the Block was another early memorable moment. In 2002, after nine years as a relatively unknown comedian, thanks to a recommendation by Choi Jin-sil, he hosted the program Live and Enjoy Together. He then rose to prominence when he co-hosted a program called The Crash of MCs with Kang Ho-dong, Lee Hwi-jae, and Kim Han-seok.

His first Grand Prize award was for the talk show Happy Together Friends.

Mainstream recognition as "Nation's MC"

X-Man
Yoo later hosted the show X-Man, which soon grew to be one of the most popular and highest rated shows in South Korea. During that time, Yoo became increasingly popular and many programs began to nickname him "the nation's MC". He went on to host various shows, including New X-Man, Old TV, and Haja! Go! (Let's Do It) for SBS, but these were all soon canceled due to low ratings on Sunday evenings. However, X-Man has found success in international syndication, and Yoo gained popularity among Korean Wave fans.

Infinite Challenge
Yoo was a part of the cast of the top-rated comedy variety program Infinite Challenge. He had been the host-in-chief since 2005 and was one of the program's founding members.

Despite low ratings during its premiere, the show went on to become one of the most popular and influential variety programs in Korea. Dubbed the "national variety show" in Korea, Infinite Challenge became the forerunner of many programs that used a similar format. Since 2 December 2006, the program has received the highest ratings of prime-time lineups for Saturday evening.

Yoo revealed his love for the program during 1-on-1 talk with fellow co-host, Jeong Hyeong-don, on a "Pause" special (S04E300) that aired on 20 October 2012. He said, "I think my life on television and variety shows will be tied to the fate of Infinite Challenge... When will we ever get to do another program like this? No matter how hard you try, it's going to be impossible to do another show like this."

Talk shows
Yoo also co-hosts Come to Play with Kim Won-hee and Happy Together Season 3. In particular, Happy Together was one of the longest running talk shows in Korea and has consistently earned high ratings.

Good Sunday Variety Programs: Family Outing and Running Man
Yoo became the main host of Family Outing as part of SBS's Good Sunday lineup. Together with Lee Hyori, Yoon Jong-shin, Kim Su-ro, Lee Chun-hee, Kang Dae-sung, Park Ye-jin, and Kim Jong-kook (since episode 19), they made up the "family" (cast members) of the show. Family Outing became one of the top-rated shows in Korea, consistently achieving the highest ratings for the Sunday mid-afternoon time-slot, and it gained popularity among Hallyu fans.

Since 11 July 2010, Yoo has hosted the urban action variety Running Man together with fellow Infinite Challenge member Haha, fellow Family Outing member Kim Jong-kook, other entertainers such as Ji Suk-jin, Leessang's Gary (who left since episode 324 to focus on his music career), Song Ji-hyo, Lee Kwang-soo (who left after episode 559 to continue with the rehab of an injury he sustained from the past year), Song Joong-ki (who left since episode 41 to focus on his acting career), Lizzy of After School (who left due to schedule conflicts), Jeon So-min and Yang Se-chan (both joined since episode 346). Although the program did not have a good start in ratings, it later became very popular and has held a consistent international fanbase to this day.

Post Infinite Challenge
After the end of Infinite Challenge, Yoo's biggest show, in March 2018, articles were being written about how Yoo was in a crisis and past his prime. Though with himself still topping popularity charts, new shows of his such as Laborhood on Hire and You Quiz on the Block while finding moderate success and having favourable reviews, were not able to fill the shoes of Infinite Challenge.

Second heyday: Hangout with Yoo
Hangout with Yoo was the eagerly anticipated new project with the partnership of the power duo from Infinite Challenge. The main driving forces for the success of Infinite Challenge are main program director Kim Tae-ho and Yoo, as the main host. Unfortunately, initial reactions to the show were not ideal and ratings were plummeting, leaving many Infinite Challenge fans disappointed.

After the disappointing start a few episodes in, the show began working on a new project. The project was to have Yoo learn to play a simple beat on a drum set. The recorded sample was then passed down from musician to musician in which each musician would add their own accompaniment in, and ultimately end up with a complete song. With the start of this project, ratings and reviews for the show were picking up.

With the show slowly picking up in popularity, the media labelled the show as Yoo's second heyday with his debut as a rookie trot singer, Yoo San-seul for another of the show's project. Yoo released a three-track trot album, Bbong For Yoo.

Other notable programs: Sugar Man and Busted!
From 2015 to 2016, Yoo hosted the program Two Yoo Project Sugar Man together with Yoo Hee-yeol. The program focuses on current popular artists remaking hit songs from singers who have disappeared from the public eye. The show returned again for a second season in 2018 with Yoo co-hosting alongside Yoo Hee-yeol, Joy (Red Velvet), and Park Na-rae. The show then returned again for a third season in late 2019 with Yoo co-hosting alongside You Hee-yeol, Kim Eana and Heize.

Yoo hosted both seasons of Netflix's variety show, Busted!, which aired in 2018 until 2021.

Guest appearances and collaborations
In 2012, Yoo appeared in the music video for Psy's hit single "Gangnam Style". In the video, he reprises the retro disco dancing character he created for the mock-band "Sagging Snail" in Infinite Challenges West Coast Highway Music Festival special, in which Psy also appeared. Following his appearance, Yoo became known worldwide as the "yellow suit guy". He also appeared in Psy's follow-up single, "Gentleman".

In 2015, Yoo collaborated with JYP in Infinite Challenge.

On 15 July 2015, Yoo signed an exclusive contract with FNC Entertainment after having been without an agency for about five years.

In 2016, Yoo collaborated with EXO for the SM Station single "Dancing King", which was also a collaboration for Infinite Challenge. He performed with them at EXO's EXO Planet #3 - EXO'rDIUM concert in Bangkok.

In 2020, through Hangout With Yoo, Yoo collaborated with Lee Hyo-ri and Rain to form the summer project co-ed trio SSAK3. Two original songs, "Beach Again" and "Play That Summer", and one cover song, "In Summer", were released. Soon after the end of SSAK3, Yoo collaborated with Lee Hyo-ri together with Kim Jong-min and Jung Jae-hyung on the "Refund Sisters" with Uhm Jung-hwa, Jessi & Hwasa as a promise after reaching number 1 in MBC Music Core show.

On 6 July 2021, Yoo left FNC Entertainment upon the expiration of his contract and became a free agent. On 14 July, it was announced Yoo has signed with Antenna.

On December 13, 2021, Yoo was diagnosed with COVID-19, canceled all of his schedules and took the necessary measures in accordance with quarantine agency guidelines. On December 21, 2021, it was reported that Yoo had recovered from the infection after completing home treatment for COVID-19, according to a health official's decision.

Philanthropy 
Since 2013, Yoo has been making steady donations to Briquette Bank to help vulnerable groups during cold winter. He had regularly made donations to House of Sharing for the women victims of the Japanese military since 2014 and in April 2018, the total of his donations was revealed to be 260 million won. In September 2018, Yoo donated 50 million won to Hope Bridge Disaster Relief Association to help the victims who are suffering from the sudden torrential rain.
In April 2019, Yoo donated 50 million won to Hope Bridge Disaster Relief Association to support the victims of Gangwon forest fire. He donated 100 million won each in 2019 and 2020 to the Samsung Life Public Welfare Foundation. In August 2020, Yoo donated 100 million won to the 2020 flood damage emergency relief campaign through Hope Bridge Disaster Relief Association.

On April 26, 2021, Yoo donated 50 million won to the youth portal, as he promised to Father Lee Moon-soo during You Quiz on the Block in April 21. In July 2021, Yoo donated 50 million to The International Development Cooperation G-Foundation and his donation was said to be used to provide sanitary products and living expenses to the underprivileged who are suffering during COVID-19 pandemic.

On March 7, 2022, Yoo donated 100 million won to the Hope Bridge Disaster Relief Association to help the victims of the massive wildfire that started in Uljin, Gyeongbuk and has spread to Samcheok, Gangwon.

In May 2022, Yoo donated 50 million won to The 11th International Development Cooperation NGO G-Foundation, which will be used for education and health support programs for women and children from low-income families.

In June 2022, Yoo donated 15 million won as medical expenses for patients in dire circumstances. On August 11, 2022, Yoo donated  (USD 70,528.86 as of November 1, 2022) to help those affected by the 2022 South Korean floods through the Hope Bridge Korea Disaster Relief Association.

In February 2023, Yoo donated 100 million won to help in the 2023 Turkey–Syria earthquake through Hope Bridge National Disaster Relief Association. On February 21, Yoo donated 50 million won to help provide sanitary pads for vulnerable women through the G Foundation.

In the media
Yoo has been dubbed "the nation's MC" for his broad appeal and popularity with a wide demographic of viewers. 
He has consistently ranked as the top comedian in South Korea, topping the Gallup poll from 2005 to 2009, and for ten consecutive years since 2012. He is one of the highest paid television personalities in Korea, and one of the most in-demand endorsers.

Known for his exemplary image, Yoo has consistently been picked as a role model by fellow entertainers, as well as the citizens of Korea. He makes donations regularly to several causes, and has participated in philanthropic acts.

Yoo is the first television host to have his own wax figure, currently displayed at the Grevin Seoul Museum.

Personal life
On 6 July 2008, Yoo married MBC announcer, who worked with him on the show Infinite Challenge. Yoo and his wife welcomed their first child, a son, Yoo Ji-ho, on 1 May 2010. Their second child, a daughter, Yoo Na-eun was born on 19 October 2018.

Filmography

List of current programs

Web show

Discography

Singles

As lead artist

Collaborations

As featured artist

Music credits 

Music credits adapted from the Korea Music Copyright Association. .

Awards and nominations

References

External links 

  
 
 

1972 births
Living people
Infinite Challenge members
Seoul Institute of the Arts alumni
South Korean Buddhists
South Korean comedians
South Korean male film actors
South Korean male television actors
South Korean television presenters
Gangneung Yoo clan
SSAK3 members
Best Variety Performer Male Paeksang Arts Award (television) winners